The European Assembly (Pay and Pensions) Act 1979 (c. 50) since 1986 named the European Parliament (Pay and Pensions) Act 1979 (c. 50)  is an Act of the Parliament of the United Kingdom which made provision for the payment of salaries and pensions, and the provision of allowances and facilities, to or in respect of Representatives to the Assembly of the European Communities (now known as MEP's). It was given Royal assent on 26 July 1979

See also
 Member of the European Parliament
 European Parliament
 European Communities 
 List of Acts of the Parliament of the United Kingdom relating to the European Communities / European Union

Acts of the Parliament of the United Kingdom relating to the European Union
United Kingdom Acts of Parliament 1979
Euroscepticism in the United Kingdom